The 2021–22 FFB Top League was the inaugural and only season of the FFB Top League, sanctioned by the Football Federation of Belize (FFB), taking over from the Premier League of Belize (PLB) as the highest competitive football league in Belize. There were two seasons spread over two years, the opening (played towards the end of 2021) and the closing (played at the beginning of 2022).

The FFB Top League was put in place by the FFB due to the PLB being subject to restrictions mandated by the Supreme Court of Belize. The formation of the league will fulfil the requirement made by FIFA to restart football in Belize, as well as protecting the participating berth for the FFB for the 2022 CONCACAF League. 
 
The FFB expected to only administer the 2021–22 tournament, providing that the PLB legal matters will be resolved during this time.

Teams
Six teams were successful in meeting all of the requirements to compete in the inaugural season. From the 2019–20 Premier League of Belize closing season, four teams joined the opening season of the FFB Top League. These were Altitude,  San Pedro Pirates, Verdes and Wagiya. The additional two teams were made up of Caesar Ridge from Belize City, who previously competed in amateur level competitions in the country, and Garden City, a newly formed team from Belmopan.

On 17 October 2021 the most successful team in the PLB era, Belmopan Bandits, released a statement confirming that they will not participate in the FFB Top League. The Bandits refused to sign a participation agreement created by the FFB, citing several reasons.

For the opening season, all games were played at the Isidoro Beaton Stadium in Belmopan with no fans in attendance, due to the COVID-19 pandemic. For the closing season, games were played at various stadiums around the country, including the FFB Stadium in Belmopan. 500 fully vaccinated fans were allowed to attend per game.

Opening season
The team that accumulates the most points at the end of the ten rounds of games will be crowned as the opening season champion. The opening season commenced on 23 October 2021.

League table

Results

Season statistics

Top scorers

Hat-tricks

Notes
4 Player scored 4 goals

Awards

The individual awards for the opening season were announced after the final game on 19 December 2021.

Closing season
The format will be the same as the opening season, with the team that accumulates the most points at the end of the ten rounds of games being crowned as the closing season champion. The closing season commenced on 5 February 2022.

League table

Results

Season statistics

Top scorers

References

Top level Belizean football league seasons
1
Belize